Andrew Pau is an associate professor of music theory at Oberlin Conservatory.  Focusing primarily on music of 19th-century French composers, Pau has presented work on text setting, chromatic harmony, and phrase rhythm in addition to theories of musical meaning and narrative. In April 2016, he was a contestant on the game show Jeopardy!, winning six games and $170,202. In the 2017 Tournament of Champions, he won his quarterfinal game and finished second in his semifinal game, behind Austin Rogers.

Education
AB, Stanford University, 1990
JD, Harvard Law School, 1993
MM, Mannes College of Music, 2005
PhD, City University of New York, 2012

References

External links

Living people
American musicologists
Oberlin Conservatory of Music faculty
Jeopardy! contestants
Year of birth missing (living people)
Stanford University alumni
Harvard Law School alumni
City University of New York alumni
Mannes School of Music alumni